Bhilwara is one of the 200 Legislative Assembly constituencies of Rajasthan state in India. It is in Bhilwara district and Bhilwara Lok Sabha Constituency.

Member of Legislative Assembly

Election results

2018

See also
List of constituencies of the Rajasthan Legislative Assembly
Bhilwara district

References

Bhilwara district
Assembly constituencies of Rajasthan